Jochen Klepper (22 March 1903 – 11 December 1942) was a German writer, poet and journalist.

Life
Klepper was born in Beuthen, Silesia (now in Poland). Suffering from severe asthma, he was schooled at home by his father, a Lutheran minister, until the age of 14. He then studied at the Gymnasium in Glogau. In 1922, he started studying theology at the University of Erlangen, before transferring to the University of Breslau a year later. He completed his degree and began doctoral studies, but in 1926 he abandoned this, instead working as a church publisher and later a journalist to support his family. He held a sermon as a substitute to his ill father in 1927. He married Johanna Stein from a Jewish family in 1931. They moved to Berlin where he worked for the radio but was dismissed in 1933.

Starting in December 1935, he wrote for Karl Ludwig Freiherr von und zu Guttenbergs journal  (White Papers).

In December 1940, he was drafted by the German Army — perhaps a bureaucratic mistake since citizens married to Jews were not to be drafted. His wife however had been baptized just prior to their church wedding in 1938. While Klepper did not see combat, he served in a supply unit for forces through Bulgaria, Poland and Soviet Union before being discharged in 1942 to tend to his wife.

On 11 December 1942, after Adolf Eichmann refused visa for the couple's second daughter, the three of them committed suicide by turning on a gas valve. Jochen wrote in his journal just before they died: "Tonight we die together. Over us stands in the last moments the image of the blessed Christ who surrounds us. With this view we end our lives." After their death, his sister Hildegard gave the diary to the Allied trial against Adolf Eichmann where it was used as evidence against him (Session 51).

Diary 
The book In the Shadow of Your Wings, appeared in 1956, contains a selection from the diaries of Klepper.

Klepper wrote many hymns that became part of modern Protestant and Catholic hymnals, such as "Gott wohnt in einem Lichte" and the Advent hymn "".

References

External links

 Klepper's Life, Theology, and Spiritual Poetry
 List of texts by Klepper at liederdatenbank.de

1903 births
1942 suicides
People from Nowa Sól County
German Lutherans
German male journalists
German non-fiction writers
German diarists
Suicides by gas
People from the Province of Silesia
Suicides in Germany
20th-century German poets
German male poets
20th-century German male writers
20th-century German journalists
20th-century Lutherans
German Army personnel of World War II
1942 deaths
20th-century diarists
Suicides by Jews during the Holocaust
German people who died in the Holocaust